Alan dos Santos Possato or simply Possato (born January 30, 1979), is a Brazilian football player who plays left back.

Honours
Brasiliense
 Campeonato Brasiliense: 2004

Ceará
 Campeonato Cearense: 2006

References

1979 births
Living people
Footballers from Rio de Janeiro (city)
Brazilian footballers
Association football defenders
Campeonato Brasileiro Série A players
Campeonato Brasileiro Série B players
CR Vasco da Gama players
America Football Club (RJ) players
Sociedade Esportiva e Recreativa Caxias do Sul players
Esporte Clube Bahia players
Marília Atlético Clube players
Brasiliense Futebol Clube players
Sport Club do Recife players
Ceará Sporting Club players
Atlético Clube Goianiense players
Vila Nova Futebol Clube players
Santa Helena Esporte Clube players
Associação Botafogo Futebol Clube players
Bangu Atlético Clube players